Franklin Day Jones (1879–1967) was an author in mechanical engineering and toolmaking.  He wrote the first edition of Machinery's Handbook (1914, Industrial Press), with engineer Erik Oberg.

Works 

 Machinery's Handbook (1914, 1st ed., Industrial Press, with Erik Oberg)
 Planing and Milling (1914, Industrial Press)
 Machinery's Encyclopedia (1917, with Erik Oberg)
 Shop management and systems (1918, Industrial Press)
 Turning and Boring (1915, Industrial Press)
 Ingenious Mechanisms for Designers and Inventors (1930)
 Machine Shop Training Course, (1964, 5th ed., Industrial Press)

References

External links
 
 
 Machinery's Handbook Collector's Edition: 1914 First Edition Replica

1879 births
1967 deaths
American mechanical engineers
American engineering writers